KMTK (99.7 FM, "The Bull") is a commercial radio station licensed to serve Bend, Oregon, United States.  The station is owned by Combined Communications, Inc.

KMTK broadcasts a country music format.  Notable programming includes "The Morning Buzz" with JT Lancer & Donna James on weekday mornings, "Work Daze" with Dave Christi, and "The Afternoon Rush" with Sabrina Sloan.  Syndicated music programming includes America's Grand Ole Opry Weekend from Westwood One.

History
This station received its original construction permit from the Federal Communications Commission on April 20, 2000.  The new station was assigned the call letters KMTK by the FCC on May 9, 2000.  KMTK received its license to cover from the FCC on August 29, 2000.

References

External links
KMTK official website

MTK
Country radio stations in the United States
Radio stations established in 2000
Deschutes County, Oregon
2000 establishments in Oregon